The 2015 Alps Tour was the 15th season of the Alps Tour, one of four third-tier tours recognised by the European Tour. In July, it was announced that all Alps Tour events, beginning with the Alps de Andalucía, would receive Official World Golf Ranking points at the minimum level of 4 points for a winner of a 54-hole event and 6 points for a winner of a 72-hole event.

Schedule
The following table lists official events during the 2015 season.

Order of Merit
The Order of Merit was based on prize money won during the season, calculated using a points-based system. The top five players on the tour (not otherwise exempt) earned status to play on the 2016 Challenge Tour.

Notes

References

Alps Tour